The A4234, also known as the Central Link Road, is a spur off the A4232 in Cardiff, the capital of Wales.  It links the southern part of Cardiff city centre to the motorway network.  The length of the A4234 is just  and is entirely a two lane dual carriageway with clearway restrictions.  The road was opened on 16 February 1989.

Junctions

See also 
 Transport in Cardiff

Notes

References
 Cardiff & Newport A-Z Street Atlas 2007 Edition

External links
 

Roads in Wales
Transport in Cardiff